On 24 January 2020, six people were killed and two others were wounded in a mass shooting in Rot am See, Germany. One suspect, a 26-year-old German citizen, was arrested after reporting himself to the police.

Shooting
The shooting either occurred inside a restaurant or inside a train station and a nearby house. The motive is suspected to be a family dispute. Three men and three women were killed, aged from 36 to 69. The victims were family members of the shooter, including his parents. The shooting happened around 12:45 local time (11:45 UTC). German authorities on Saturday increased their investigation into the motivation behind the shooting. Criminologist and criminal psychologist Rudolf Egg said that the shooter acted impulsively and explosively, ruling out the possibility that the attack was premeditated.

Victims
Three of the victims killed were men aged 36, 65 and 69, while the three others were women aged 36, 56 and 62. The police confirmed that two of the deceased were the suspect's parents.

Two other victims were alive and being treated in a local hospital, one with life-threatening injuries. Two people were found inside the house, and four people in front of it. The two injured victims were a man and a woman, whom the authorities said were "not locals." Officials were trying to determine what relationship they might have had to the suspect.

On the Saturday night after, citizens of Rot am See placed memorial candles for the victims in the place.

References 

2020 mass shootings in Europe
21st century in Baden-Württemberg
Crime in Baden-Württemberg
Familicides
January 2020 crimes in Europe
January 2020 events in Germany
Mass shootings in Germany
Schwäbisch Hall (district)